Marlou Salcedo Arizala (born May 11, 1998), also known as Xander Ford, is a Filipino social media personality.

Background
Arizala was a member of the boy band Hasht5, a boy band parody whose videos became popular in 2015. After leaving Hasht5 to pursue a solo career, he underwent plastic surgery, changing his name to "Xander Ford". His transformation received widespread coverage online.

Prior to that, the band Hasht5 experienced online bullying "because of their physical appearance". Arizala was first noticed after a viral video of himself lipsyncing as "papogi".

On October 1, 2017, he made his television appearance with a new look on Rated K which was met by favorable support. Ford also made his television appearance, portraying himself on sitcom program Home Sweetie Home.

Controversies 
On the second week of October 2017, an apparent Ford mocks actress Kathryn Bernardo over her bow-leggedness through the video clip. However, Star Image Artist Management, through its Facebook account, denied that the man in the video was Xander. The management says that it was possibly impersonating Ford's voice in order to defame him. They also said that any personality made this such attitude will not be tolerated. Bernardo expressed her dismay about cyberbullying in her Instagram account. Khalil Ramos, one of the closest friends of Bernardo and her tandem Daniel Padilla, said that the supposed Ford "should apologize". Other celebrities, including Karla Estrada, Sofia Andres, and Gretchen Ho, expressed their disappointment on their Twitter account. Ford apologized and he also said that it was his former personality, mocking Bernardo. Despite his admittance, he received several negative messages.

On October 30, 2017, Arizala filed a cyberbullying complaint against two individuals behind a video of him to the Philippine National Police.

On November 24, 2017, Star Image reported that Xander Ford went missing. According to the talent agency, he was last seen in General Trias on November 23. The next day, Ford shared a Facebook video where he denied the reports of his alleged disappearance. He explained that he was taking a break from work and social media.

On April 23, 2019, Star Image Artist Management announced that they would suspend Arizala and decided to "take back" the Xander Ford name due to his unprofessional behavior. Arizala reunited with Hasht5 in late May 2019. "I think we are ready to perform," he indicated in the caption of a photo on social media.

On June 18, 2020, Arizala was accused of rape and physical abuse by his ex-girlfriend, Ysah Cabrejas.

On July 17, 2020, through his Instagram stories, Arizala came out as bisexual.

Arizala was arrested on December 22, 2020 in Pasay on a violence against women complaint filed by his former girlfriend. The next day, Arizala was released from jail after his agency Star Image Artist Management posted bail of P18,000. In October 2021, he said that his former girlfriend decided not to pursue the case against him after a settlement.

References

1998 births
Living people
ABS-CBN personalities
Filipino male television actors
Filipino YouTubers
People from Cavite
Filipino LGBT actors
Filipino LGBT singers
Bisexual men